Upload can mean:

Upload, transferring a file to or from another computer. See also File transfer and File sharing.
Mind uploading, the hypothetical transfer of a human mind into a computer by brain emulation
Upload (TV series), an American science fiction comedy web television series premiered on May 1, 2020.
Upload, Inc. (formerly UploadVR, Inc.) was an American virtual reality-focused technology and media company based in Marina del Rey, California.